Adom Getachew is an Ethiopian-American political scientist. She is the Neubauer Family Assistant Professor of Political Science and the College at the University of Chicago. She is the author of Worldmaking after Empire: The Rise and Fall of Self-Determination.

Adom was awarded a PhD in Political Science and African-American Studies from Yale University in 2015. She was born in Ethiopia. She was raised in Ethiopia and Botswana until the age of 13, when her family moved to Arlington, Virginia, United States.

References 

American political scientists
Ethiopian political scientists
Living people
University of Chicago faculty
Women political scientists
Yale Graduate School of Arts and Sciences alumni
Year of birth missing (living people)